is a railway station in the city of Motosu, Gifu Prefecture, Japan, operated by the private railway operator Tarumi Railway.

Lines

Station layout
Tarumi Station has one ground-level island platform connected to the station building by a level crossing. The station is unattended.

Adjacent stations

|-
!colspan=5|Tarumi Railway

History
Tarumi Station opened on March 25, 1989. The station building was rebuilt after a fire in April 2017.

Surrounding area
 Neo River
Neo Post Office
Neo Elementary School

See also
 List of Railway Stations in Japan

References

External links

 

Railway stations in Gifu Prefecture
Railway stations in Japan opened in 1989
Stations of Tarumi Railway
Motosu, Gifu